Events from the year 1787 in France.

Incumbents 
Monarch: Louis XVI

Events

February
22 February - The Assembly of Notables is held

November
7 November - Louis XVI signs the Edict of Versailles, giving religious freedom to non-Catholics in France. 
21 November - The Treaty of Versailles (1787) is signed between Louis XVI and the Vietnamese prince Nguyễn Ánh.

Births
24 January - Christophe-Paulin de La Poix de Fréminville 
2 February - Charles Etienne Boniface
8 February - Théodore Basset de Jolimont
2 May - Martial de Guernon-Ranville
1 August - Edmond de Talleyrand-Périgord
15 August - Francois Sudre

Deaths
13 February - Charles Gravier, comte de Vergennes

See also

References

1780s in France